Hanner Fieldhouse is a 4,325-seat multi-purpose arena in Statesboro in the U.S. state of Georgia. It was built in 1969 and is home to the Georgia Southern University men's basketball, women's basketball and women's volleyball teams. It hosted the 1985 and 1992 Atlantic Sun Conference men's basketball tournaments.

In addition to athletic events, Hanner Fieldhouse also is home to the university's fall commencement ceremonies and featured an election rally by then-president George W. Bush in 2006. In 2007, the university held three separate ceremonies at the facility to accommodate the university's growing number of graduates. The older Hanner Gymnasium, which is part of the newer complex, hosted a Rolling Stones concert on May 4, 1965.

On July 21, 2014, the university announced that Hanner Fieldhouse was closed until further notice for construction and more information would be provided as the details became available. In October, 2014 the Fieldhouse reopened after minor renovations and held the university's 23rd-annual fall commencement.

New arena 
In February 2021, Georgia Southern unveiled plans for a new convocation center in the university's "South Campus" expansion to replace Hanner Fieldhouse. The convocation center is planned to be named after the late Jack and Ruth Ann Hill, both of whom were Georgia Southern alumni. Natives of nearby Reidsville, Jack Hill was a long-serving state senator whose district included Statesboro and Bulloch County, and Ruth Ann Hill was a career educator, retiring as principal of Reidsville Elementary School. The convocation center is expected to cost $64.4 million and seat 5,500 people for basketball games and up to 5,900 for convocation, commencement, and other events. Groundbreaking for the new convocation center took place on May 26, 2022, and the center is projected to open in the spring of 2024.

See also
 List of NCAA Division I basketball arenas

References

College basketball venues in the United States
Georgia Southern Eagles men's basketball
Basketball venues in Georgia (U.S. state)
Buildings and structures in Bulloch County, Georgia
1969 establishments in Georgia (U.S. state)
Sports venues completed in 1969